Justin Monjo (born 1963, New York) is an American screenwriter, television producer, and actor, best known for his work on Farscape and penning the Farscape movie in 2014.

He is the son of children's author F. N. Monjo III and the great-great-grandson of arctic furrier F. N. Monjo. Monjo wrote Adrian Pasdar's film debut screenplay Cement and worked on Young Lions. He created the 2005 TV series The Alice with Robyn Sinclair. He graduated from NIDA in 1985, alongside actresses Catherine McClements and Sonia Todd, and director Baz Luhrmann.
His adaptation with his former NIDA teacher Nick Enright of Cloudstreet by Tim Winton enjoyed huge critical and box-office success at the Festivals of Sydney and Perth, on tour of Australia, at the Festival of Dublin, and in London.

References

External links

Australian screenwriters
Australian television producers
Living people
1963 births
National Institute of Dramatic Art alumni